Klutter is a segment that ran on Eek! Stravaganza's fourth season from 1995 to 1996 on the Fox Kids block. It was created by David Silverman and Savage Steve Holland. The segment was animated by the same people who used to work for Fox's The Critic, which was canceled that year. The executive producers were David Silverman, Savage Steve Holland, and Phil Roman. Unlike the Eek and Thunderlizard segments, this was a Fox Children's Productions and Savage Studios co-production in association with Film Roman for animation. Six episodes were produced.

Ownership of the series passed to Disney in 2001 when Disney acquired Fox Kids Worldwide. The series is not available on Disney+.

Plot
The segment follows Ryan and Wade Heap, who cannot have a pet because their father is allergic to pets. So they decide to make a pet on their own, out of a pile of junk (Klutter) by static electricity. There are other characters in the show, like Sandee Heap, who was lonely at first, before Klutter came into their lives. They went on mysteries, a la Scooby-Doo, to save animals and solve crimes.

Characters

Klutter
Klutter (vocal effects provided by Kirk Thatcher) is the eponymous star of the show. He is a pet made from a pile of clothes from static electricity by Ryan and Wade Heap. Klutter is thought as a dog in the show, mostly because of licking other people faces (mostly Vanna), and alerting the gang what is going on. Of course, Klutter is sometimes ignored by Ryan, Wade and the gang while alerting or saving somebody, or squashed by objects and other things. Klutter's owner's parents does not know that he exist.

Ryan Heap
Ryan Heap (voiced by Cam Clarke) is the oldest of the Heap children. He wants to be a reporter just like his father. But his father laughs at him because he thinks the stuff are not real. He was the leader of the gang. His hairdo would change different colors in almost every episode.

Wade Heap
Wade Heap (voiced by Savage Steve Holland) is the middle child with a mild attitude. He does not say much, but that is because he is quiet most of the time. He has a distinctive low/Geeky voice.

Kopp
Kopp (voiced by Michael Zorek) is a character that is very crazy, paranoid, and sometimes lazy. He is an underachiever, who has a not so secret crush on Vanna. It is known that Kopp was based on the real Bill Kopp, who could not participate to work on Klutter at the time.

Sandee Heap
Sandee Heap (voiced by Sandy Fox) is the youngest of the Heaps. She is a preschooler that was previously lonely until Klutter came around and brightened up her day. She is often noted for her extremely high voice.

Vanna Erving
Vanna Erving (voiced by Halle Stanford) is Ryan, Wade, and Sandee's neighbor that lives next door. She is a teacher's pet, bright, and sometimes mean and bossy. She cannot stand either Klutter or Kopp for their silly actions sometimes. She is sometimes a brat when she feels like acting one.

John Heap
John Heap (voiced by David Silverman) is the father of Ryan, Wade and Sandee Heap. He is a news reporter that most of the time claims that the town he lives in is dull, although exciting (and scary) things happens when he does not look.

Andrea Heap
Andrea Heap (voiced by Kathy Ireland) is the mother of Ryan, Wade and Sandee Heap. She wants Ryan and Wade to focus on growing up (and picking up their Klutter off the floor). She is also a 1960s like mom who is a little ditsy. She is also a library employee.

Mel Erving
Mel Erving (voiced by Dan Castellaneta) is the father of Vanna Erving.

Nel Erving
Nel Erving (voiced by Amy Heckerling) is the mother of Vanna Erving.

Episodes

Cast
 Kirk Thatcher .... Klutter
 Cam Clarke .... Ryan Heap
 Savage Steve Holland .... Wade Heap
 Sandy Fox .... Sandee Heap
 Michael Zorek .... Kopp
 Halle Stanford .... Vanna Ervin
 David Silverman .... John Heap
 Kathy Ireland .... Andrea Heap
 Dan Castellaneta .... Mel Ervin/Additional Voices
 Amy Heckerling .... Nel Ervin
 Gary Owens .... Additional Voices
 Brad Garrett .... Additional Voices
 Charlie Adler .... Additional Voices

References

External links
 

Klutter
1990s American animated television series
1995 American television series debuts
1996 American television series endings
American children's animated comedy television series
Klutter
Television series by 20th Century Fox Television 
Television series by Film Roman
Television series by Saban Entertainment